De Todas Maneras Rosa (International title: Love Gone Crazy, Literally: Anyway Rosa) is a Venezuelan telenovela written by Carlos Pérez for Venevisión.

Marisa Román and Ricardo Álamo star as the main protagonists while Norkys Batista, Luciano D'Alessandro, Gustavo Rodríguez and Beba Rojas star as the main antagonists.

Venevisión began broadcasting De todas maneras Rosa from June 25, 2013 at 10:00 pm. Since 8 July, De todas maneras Rosa was moved to be broadcast at 9 pm. The last episode was broadcast on January 17, 2014 with Cosita Linda replacing it the following week. Production of De todas maneras Rosa officially began on January 29, 2013 in Caracas.

Plot
De todas maneras Rosa revolves around the romantic relationship between Rosa (Marisa Román) and Leonardo Alfonso (Ricardo Álamo). However, an unforeseen tragic event will change Rosa's personality. Rosa's baby son dies in an accidental explosion, and this incident changes her personality completely. She becomes sympathetic, intelligent and charming. Doctors study her case and conclude that these are not signs of coping with a tragedy, but rather the symptoms of a mental disorder.

Ten years pass without Rosa seeing Leonardo. Rosa comes back to Venezuela after years of studying in London in order to look for a job to take her mother Alma  (Virginia Urdaneta) for treatment. She meets Luis Enrique (Antonio Delli), a gay man who hires her to pretend to be his girlfriend in front of his family and friends, so that he can show his father that he is a macho man. Luis Enrique's father, Anselmo (Gustavo Rodriguez) is a man running a secret shady business in the city. The twist comes when she discovers that Leonardo is Luis' brother, and that the child she thought was lost is actually alive and living as the youngest son of the Macho Vergara family.

Cast

Main Cast

Guest actors

Awards

References

External links
Official page at Venevision 
TC Television page

Venevisión telenovelas
2013 telenovelas
Venezuelan telenovelas
2013 Venezuelan television series debuts
2014 Venezuelan television series endings
Spanish-language telenovelas
Television shows set in Caracas